Kerala Thunderbolts is an elite commando force of the Kerala Police set up in accordance with the Indian central government's directions post the 2008 Mumbai attacks. The commando force has been created to counter possible terror strikes and carry out counterinsurgency operations in Kerala.  The force modeled on the Special Protection Group and National Security Guard are trained to engage in air, water and land attacks.

Known operations 

A Thunderbolt team carried out a combing operation in the Malappuram district following reports of sighting of Maoist insurgents in February, 2013.
In March 2013, a 30-member Thunderbolt team was involved in a counterinsurgency combing operation in search of suspected Maoist insurgents in Kannur district in Kerala. On 6 December 2014, A gunfight broke out  in a forest in Kerala's hilly Wayanad district between the  Thunderbolt unit and the left-wing rebels (Maoist). It was the first direct encounter between police and Maoists in the history of Kerala and no casualties were reported.

Selection and training 

The commando force consists of 2 companies of 160 personnel, who have been recruited after undergoing 2 years of rigorous and specialized training at various institutions around the country including Army's Counter Insurgency and Jungle Warfare School, Mizoram.
Ex-Chief minister Oommen Chandy, announced the approval of the Central Government for raising a second battalion of 40 more personnel, in the wake of increased terrorist activity across India.

The recruits, in the 18–21 age group, were selected after going through the Three Star physical Efficiency Test and Endurance test, as specified by the Kerala Public Service Commission. The second stage training was completed at Commando School, Chennai, National Disaster Management School, Coimbatore, Counter insurgency and Anti Terrorism School, Silchar, National Adventure School, Munnar, Underwater Operation and Diving school, Kochi and Airborne Operation Air force School, New Delhi.

See also 
 Nilambur incident

References

External links 
 https://www.youtube.com/watch?v=q9g5TIgSwLc – in Malayalam

Non-military counterterrorist organizations
Kerala Police
2012 establishments in Kerala
Government agencies established in 2012